The Yazidi cemetery of Hesen Begê is a more than 300 years old Yazidi cemetery in southeastern Turkey.

History 
In March 2020, tombstones in the cemetery were destroyed by strangers.

Location 
The cemetery is about 1.5 km north of Çilesiz (Mezrê) and about 1 km west of Mağaracık (Xanik), and about 2.5 km southeast of Güneli (Geliyê Sora).

References

External links 

Cemeteries in Turkey
Yazidi places
Nusaybin
Buildings and structures in Mardin Province